Jiksan Station is a station on the Gyeongbu Line in the city of Cheonan in Chungcheongnam-do, South Korea. It is served by trains on Seoul Subway Line 1.

References

External links

 Station information from Korail

Seoul Metropolitan Subway stations
Railway stations in Korea opened in 1905
Metro stations in Cheonan